Destination Freedom was a series of weekly radio programs which was produced by WMAQ in Chicago. The first set ran from 1948 to 1950 and it presented the biographical histories of prominent African-Americans such as George Washington Carver, Satchel Paige, Frederick Douglass, Harriet Tubman, and Lena Horne. The scripts for those shows were written by Richard Durham. Studs Terkel voiced some of the radio characters. Hugh Downs also served as an announcer in both the initial and 1950 series.

The second series of shows ran from 1950 to 1951, and it was produced without Durham. This second series featured patriotic themed dramas which were largely based on Americanism and anti-Communism.

The show was the brainchild of African-American journalist and author Richard Durham. In cooperation with The Chicago Defender, he began this series over NBC Chicago outlet WMAQ in June 1948, with scripts emphasizing the progress of African-Americans from the days of slavery to the ongoing struggle for racial justice. Airing in Sunday-morning public-service time, the series built a steady audience in the Midwest with inspirational stories of social progress, earning strong support from Civil Rights organizations, and offering employment to a wide range of African-American performers. Episodes began with a stanza from the spiritual "Oh, Freedom".

Destination Freedom premiered on June 27, 1948, on Chicago radio WMAQ. Durham's vision was to reeducate the masses on the image of African American society, since he believed that it was tainted with inaccurate and derogatory stereotypes. Week after week, Durham would generate all-out attacks on these stereotypes by illustrating the lives of prominent African-Americans. For two years, Durham wrote script after script for Destination Freedom, receiving no financial compensation for his effort. In 1950, Durham's financial needs forced him to accept an offer by Don Ameche to write material for him. It is also said that Durham's relationship with NBC and WMAQ was not entirely harmonious. Continuing without Durham, the final year of the program turned to general themes of "American freedom," without the sharp focus on the African-American experience. This, WMAQ hoped, would create a show to rival Paul Revere Speaks, which was a popular show at the time. For about 50 years, the show was long forgotten until some transcripts were found, and the characters voiced by Fred Pinkard, Oscar Brown Jr., Wezlyn Tilden, and Janice Kingslow, were heard once more.

Two early recordings, "A Garage in Gainesville" and "Execution Awaited", are listed in National Recording Registry. In 1949 it received a first-place commendation from the Ohio State University Institute for Education by Radio.

Richard Durham episodes

 1948 episodes
 The Knock-Kneed Man – Crispus Attucks – June 27 and July 30, 1950
 Railway to Freedom – Harriet Tubman – July 4
 Dark Explorers – Moors who helped explore New Spain – July 11
 The Denmark Vesey Story – community leader in Charleston, South Carolina – July 18
 The Making of a Man – Frederick Douglass: Part 1 – June 27
 The Key to Freedom – Frederick Douglass: Part 2 – August 1
 The Heart of George Cotton – doctors Daniel Hale Williams and Ulysses Grant Dailey – August 8 and October 31.
 Truth Goes to Washington – Sojourner Truth – August 15
 Arctic Autograph – Matthew Henson – August 22
 The Story of 1875 – Charles Caldwell – August 29
 Poet in Pine Mill – James Weldon Johnson – September 5
 The Father of the Blues – W. C. Handy – September 12
 Boy with a Dream – J. Ernest Wilkins Jr. – September 19
 Shakespeare of Harlem – Langston Hughes – September 26
 Citizen – Toussaint l'Ouverture and the Haitian Revolution – October 3
 Little David – Joe Louis – October 10
 The Boy Who Was Traded for a Horse – George Washington Carver – October 17
 Echoes of Harlem – Duke Ellington – November 7
 One Out of Seventeen – Mary McLeod Bethune – November 14
 The Rhyme of the Ancient Dodger – Jackie Robinson – November 21
 Investigator for Democracy – Walter Francis White – November 28 
 Autobiography of a Hero – Doris ("Dorie") Miller – December 5
 The Pied Piper Versus Paul Revere – Albert Merritt – founder of the Boys Club of Martinsville, Indiana – December 12
 Choir Girl from Philadelphia – Marian Anderson – December 19
 Mike Rex – author Willard Motley – December 26
 1949 episodes
 Maiden Speech – Oscar Stanton De Priest – January 2
 The Boy Who Beat the Bus – Governor William H. Hastie – January 9
 The Chopin Murder Case – Hazel Scott – January 16
 The World's Fastest Human – Jesse Owens – January 23

 Last Letter Home – 332nd Fighter Group (Tuskegee Airmen) – January 30 and August 13, 1950
 Searcher for History W.E.B. Du Bois – February 6
 The Death of Aesop – February 13 and November 27
 Peace Mediator – Dr. Ralph J Bunche – February 20 and August 6, 1950
 The Houses That Paul Built – Paul R. Williams – February 27
 Do Something! Be Somebody! – Canada Lee – March 6
 Up From Slavery – Booker T. Washington – March 13
 Black Boy – Richard Wright – March 20
 Transfusion – Charles R. Drew and his work on blood transfusion – March 27
 Pagan Poet – Countee Cullen – April 3
 Woman with a Mission – Ida B. Wells – April 10
 Before I Sleep – poet Paul Laurence Dunbar – April 17
 Apostle of Freedom – Richard Allen – April 24
 Help the Blind – Josh White – May 1
 The Ballad of Satchel Paige – May 15
 The Secretary of Peace – Benjamin Banneker – May 22
 The Saga of Melody Jackson – Henry Armstrong – May 29
 Anatomy of an Ordinance – Alderman Rev. Archibald Carey – June 5
 Negro Cinderella – Lena Horne – June 12
 Ghost Editor – Roscoe Dunjee – June 19
 Harriet's Children (First anniversary program)  – June 26
 Norfolk Miracle – Dorothy Maynor – July 3 (rebroadcast  February 2002 by KGNU)
 Tales of Stackalee (Black folklore hero) – July 17
 The Legend of John Henry – a retelling of the folk hero story – July 24
 The Trumpet Talks – Louis Armstrong – July 31
 The Long Road – Mary Church Terrell – August 7
 Black Hamlet, Part I – Henri Christophe (life as a slave) – August 14
 Black Hamlet, Part II – Henri Christophe (rise to power) – August 21
 Segregation Incorporated – National Committee on Segregation in the Nation's Capital, 1947–51 – August 28; rebroadcast in January 2003 by KGNU
 The Saga of Senator Blanche K. Bruce – September 4
 The Tiger Hunt – the 761st Tank Battalion in World War II – September 11
  Poet in Bronzeville – Gwendolyn Brooks – September 18
 A Garage in Gainesville – retelling of a lynching in a small southern town – September 25
 Execution Awaited – a simulated court trial examining prejudice and racism – October 2
 Father to Son – Adam Clayton Powell Sr. and Adam Clayton Powell Jr. – October 9, rebroadcast in August 2002 by station KGNU
 Of Blood and the Boogie – Albert Ammons – October 16
Diary of a Nurse – Jane Edna Hunter – October 23
 Keeper of the Dream – Captain Hugh Mulzac, commander of the  – October 30
 The Man Who Owned Chicago – Jean Baptiste Point du Sable – November 6
 Blind Alley Symphony – Dean Dixon – November 13
 The Tale of the Tobacco Auctioneer — Kenneth R. Williams – November 20

The Death of Aesop – February 13 and November 27
 Joe Rainey vs. The Status Quo – Joseph Homer Rainey – December 4
 1950 episodes
 The Birth of a League – the Great Northern Migration and formation of the Chicago Urban League – January 15

 Lawyer of Liberty – William Henry Huff – January 22
 Portrait of Bill "Bojangles" Robinson – January 29
 Housing: Chicago – February 5
 Recorder of History – Dr. Carter G. Woodson, founded Negro History Week in Chicago – February 12

 Brotherhood Week Begins at Home – February 19 – Tribute to Hugh C. McMannan
 The Umfunddisi of Ndotsgeni – Todd Duncan – February 26
 The Atlanta Thesis – E. Franklin Frazier – March 5
 Premonition of the Panther – Sugar Ray Robinson – March 12
 The Making of a Balladeer – Lonnie Johnson – March 19
 The Liberators (Part I) – William Lloyd Garrison – March 26
  The Liberators (Part II) – Wendell Phillips – April 2
 The Buddy Young Story – April 9
 The Fifth District Crime Fighter (Captain Kinzie Bleuitt) – a dramatization of law enforcement efforts in South Side, Chicago – April 16
 The Dance Anthropologist – Katherine Dunham – April 23

 The Case of Samuel Johnson – judge Jane Bolin – May 7
 The Sorrow Songs – Spirituals – May 14
 John Hope, Educator – May 21
 The Grave Diggers' Handicap – Isaac Murphy – June 4
 The Shy Boy – Fats Waller – June 11
 The Case of the Congressman's Train Ride – Richard Westbrooks, who represented Arthur Mitchell in a US Supreme Court case – June 18
 The Angel of Federal Street – a tale about heaven and South Side, Chicago – nurse Ruth Blue Turnquist – June 25
 Kansas City Phone Call – Nat King Cole – July 2
 Mr. Jerico Adjusts a Claim – William Nickerson Jr. and the Golden State Mutual Life Insurance Company – July 9
 Test by Fire – Charlotte Hawkins – July 16
 Sing a Song for Children – Pruth McFarlin – July 23, rebroadcast in September 2002 on KGNU

Post-Durham episodes – Paul Revere "Patriotic Freedom" format

 Patriotic Format – opening show for 1950, a discussion of freedom amongst historic figures – October 15, 1950
 United Nations – promoting the establishment of the organization – December 17, 1950
 Magic Words – a recap of the basic rights of freedom – November 5, 1951
 The Golden Circle – beginnings of the Knights of the Golden Circle – November 12, 1950
 Breakdown – an arrest (of Michael Shiftkoff) by the secret police in Communist Bulgaria – November 18, 1950
 The Price (Mackton and Winston of Company 'D') – a retelling of an American infantry unit's deployment to the Korean War – November 26, 1950
 Matthew Lyon – criticism of the Alien and Sedition Acts – December 10, 1950
 Weapons for Peace (United Nations) – illustrates the danger of world-wide nuclear war – December 17, 1950
 Peace on Earth (Frank Johnson Story) – a veteran's perspective on the end of a war – December 24, 1950
 John, Alma, Johnny and Myra – drama about the Occupation of the Baltic states – December 31, 1950
 The Capture – retells the story of Nathan Hale – January 7, 1951
 Dwight David Eisenhower – retells the story of his life up to his presidential election – January 14, 1951
 Freedom of Assembly (Jeff Maxwell Story) – review of the right – February 4, 1951
 Forced Confession – promotes Due Process of Law – February 18, 1951
 Anna Zenger – the first woman to publish a newspaper in America – February 25, 1951
 Benjamin Drake Story – drama about local people opposing unruly, oppressive people – March 4, 1951
 The Dick Draper Story – drama about employment rights in the United States – March 11, 1951
 Thomas Wright, American Citizen – About private efforts, including coercion, to thwart housing segregation in the United States – March 18, 1951
 Citizen Whitney – a dramatic criticism of Marxism and religion – March 25, 1951
 The Jones Family – a dramatization about eminent domain – April 8, 1951
 Fred Custer Story – a dramatization about attending college and medical school – April 15, 1951
 Reverend Browns Half Acre – concerns property ownership – April 22, 1951
 Korean Frontline – Stories about the Korean War and communism in China – April 29, 1951
 Harper College Story (The Test) – Discusses education – May 6, 1951
 Open for Business – the difficulties and rewards of owning a small retail business – May 13, 1951
 Judge Farwell's Story – reflections of a US Federal Judge – May 19, 1951
 Anna's Story – an immigrant from Sweden – January 21, 1951
  Russell Thomas Story: Coal Miner to Pharmacist – Illustrates the opportunity for advancement available in America – June 2, 1951
 Crisis in Avondale (The Avondale Story) – a drama about how free speech can be irresponsibly misused – June 9, 1951
 Mike Yankovich, Minnesota Miner (Decision) – a drama about the costs and benefits of unionization in mining – June 16, 1951
 Wanted, a Witness – a drama about the civic responsibility to assist in solving crimes – June 23, 1951

References

Further reading
  .
 
 . Also see OTRR Maintained Archive Destination Freedom
 
 Williams, Sonja D. (2015). Word Warrior: Richard Durham, Radio, and Freedom University of Illinois Press,  
 For a book review see

External links
 Destination Freedom programs
 
 Destination Freedom: One For the History Books – review of the series by PODCAKE, June 29, 2021
 Destination Freedom – listing of shows on RUSC (R U Sitting Comfortably?)
 Destination Freedom Black Radio Days, from KGNU News – Boulder Community Broadcast Association
 Destination Freedom Black Radio Podcast, Audio Drama at its Finest, Joins Broadway Podcast Network – a modern revival of the series from No Credits Productions, LLC
 Librivox Audio Books episodes with links to audiofiles
 Power, Politics, & Pride: Durham's Destination Freedom – WTTW: Chicago's Black Metropolis (with information on prominent cast members)
 RadioGOLDINdex – Destination Freedom – listing compiled by J. David Goldin
 Richard Durham Papers – Chicago Public Library archive
 Richard Durham – Radio Hall of Fame
 Word Warrior: Richard Durham, Radio & Freedom – video presentation from the Library of Congress featuring author Sonja D. Williams

1940s American radio programs
1950s American radio programs
1948 radio programme debuts
1950 radio programme debuts
1950 radio programme endings
1951 radio programme endings
1948 establishments in Illinois
1950 establishments in Illinois
1950 disestablishments in Illinois
1951 disestablishments in Illinois
1948 in radio
1949 in radio
1950 in radio
1951 in radio
1948 works
1949 works
1950 works
1951 works
African-American cultural history
African-American radio
African-American sports history
American documentary radio programs
American radio dramas
Chicago radio shows
United States National Recording Registry recordings
Works about African-Americans